Trumpler is a crater in the Phaethontis quadrangle of Mars, located at 61.8°S latitude and 150.8°W longitude. The name was approved by IAU's Working Group for Planetary System Nomenclature in 1973.

Description 

The first image below shows the relationship among three craters that are near each other. Keeler Crater is to the North of Trumpler Crater. After Keeler was formed, a later impact formed Trumpler Crater, and in the process destroyed part of Keeler.

See also 
 Climate of Mars
 Geology of Mars
 List of craters on Mars

References 

Phaethontis quadrangle
Impact craters on Mars